Omry Maak (My Life With You) is the sixteenth full-length Arabic studio album from Egyptian pop singer Angham, released in Egypt on 13 August 2003.

Track listing

 Omry Maak (My Life With You) (Lyrics by: Ezzat elGendy | Music composed by: Sherif Tagg | Music arrangements by: Fahd)
 Mayhemsh (It Doesn't Matter) (Lyrics by: Khaled Mounir | Music composed by: Sherif Tagg | Music arrangements by: Fahd)
 Arrefha Beya (Introduce Me To Her) (Lyrics by: Essam Husni | Music composed by: Tamer Ali | Music arrangements by: Fahd)
 Esra'ny (He Captured Me) (Lyrics by: Sameh elAgami | Music composed by: Sheriff Tagg | Music arrangements by: Tarek Madkour)
 Bahtag Etkallem (In Need To Talk) (Lyrics by: Ayman Bahgat Amar | Music composed by: Khaled Ezz | Music arrangements by: Fahd)
 T'heb Atghayar (You Like Me to Metamorphose) (Lyrics by: Tarek Abdel Setar | Music composed by: Sherif Tagg | Music arrangements by: Akram eSharkawi)
 Ana Mkhassmak (I Am Mad At You) (Lyrics by: Nader Abdallah | Music composed by: Sherif Tagg | Music arrangements by: Mohammad Mustafa)
 Ala Fekra (By The Way ) (Lyrics by: Saoud Ben Abdallah | Music composed by: elFaissal | Music arrangements by: Fahd)
 Shoft elDonia (Did You See The World) (Lyrics by: Khaled Mounir | Music composed by: Sheriff Tagg | Music arrangements by: Fahd)
 Feinak (Where Are You) (Lyrics by: Mohammad Hamed | Music composed by: Tamer Ali | Music arrangements by: Fahd)
 Regena f'Kalamna (Back to Our Conversation) (Lyrics by: Nader Abdallah | Music composed by: Tamer Ali | Music arrangements by: Fahd)
 Halak (Your State) (Lyrics by: Essam Husni | Music composed by: Tamer Ali | Music arrangements by: Fahd)
 Arrefha Beya [remix] (Introduce Me To Her) (Lyrics by: Essam Husni | Music composed by: Tamer Ali | Music arrangements by: Fahd)

External links
English translation of the song Arrafha Beya

Angham albums
Arabic-language albums
2003 albums
Alam elPhan Records albums